Enzo Brichese (Rome, 17 November 1965) is a former Italian pole vaulter and long jumper and currently the coach of the Italian pole vaulter Sonia Malavisi.

Biography
Brichese has won the individual national championship 2 times. He jumped his personal best (5,60 m) in a town square event in Chiari on 15 June 1991.

National titles
2 wins in the pole vault at the Italian Athletics Indoor Championships (1988, 1989)

See also
Sonia Malavisi

References

External links
 
 Enzo Brichese at All-Athletics

1965 births
Athletes from Rome
Italian male pole vaulters
Italian male long jumpers
Living people
Italian athletics coaches